Sommer Christie is a Canadian rugby union player who participated at the 2002 and 2006 Women's Rugby World Cup. She earned an honourable mention in the list of the Ten Greatest North American Women rugby union players.

Rugby
Christie played club rugby for Ste. Anne de Bellevue RFC. She represented the Concordia Stingers in university from 1999 to 2003 while studying exercise science and was later assistant coach for the team. Christie was part of the first-ever World University Sevens Championship team.

Honours and achievements
 2001, 2002, and 2003 CIS All-Canadian
 3x CIS Academic All-Canadian
 5x QSSF All-star
 2002, QSSF women's rugby MVP
 2002, Concordia University's Female Athlete of the Year
 2004, FISU Rugby 7s All-star
 2017, Concordia University Sport Hall of Fame induction

Wheelchair rugby
Christie is a mental performance consultant for the Canadian national wheelchair rugby team.

References

External links

Living people
Canadian female rugby union players
Canada women's international rugby union players
Year of birth missing (living people)